Ilya Golendov (born 2 October 1994) is a Kazakhstani canoeist. Competing in the four-man K-4 1000 m  event he won a gold medal at the 2014 Asian Games and placed tenth at the 2016 Olympics.

Golendov was introduced to kayaking by his mother in 2004, and in 2011 was included to the national team. His wife Svetlana Golendova (Ivanchukova) is a sprint runner and won a gold medal in the 4×100 m relay at the 2015 World University Games.

References

External links

 
 
 

1994 births
Living people
People from Karaganda Region
Kazakhstani male canoeists
Olympic canoeists of Kazakhstan
Canoeists at the 2016 Summer Olympics
Place of birth missing (living people)
Asian Games gold medalists for Kazakhstan
Asian Games silver medalists for Kazakhstan
Asian Games medalists in canoeing
Canoeists at the 2014 Asian Games
Canoeists at the 2018 Asian Games
Medalists at the 2014 Asian Games
Medalists at the 2018 Asian Games
21st-century Kazakhstani people